Wonjun Lee (Korean: 이원준) is a professor of Department of Cyber Defense, School of Cybersecurity at Korea University in Seoul, Republic of Korea. His research interests include communication and network protocols, wireless communication and networking optimization techniques, security and privacy in mobile computing, and RF-powered computing and networking. He has authored 15 international patents, over 250 papers in refereed international journals and conferences, and a book “Optimal Coverage in Wireless Sensor Networks,” Springer, 2020 (with. Prof. D.-Z. Du).

Lee has served on program and organization committees of numerous leading wireless and networking conferences, including IEEE INFOCOM from 2008 to 2023, PC Track Chair of IEEE ICDCS 2019, Workshop Chair of IEEE ICDCS 2023, ACM MobiHoc from 2008 to 2009, and over 148 international conferences. He is also currently serving as a Division Editor of Wireless Communications Division of IEEE/KICS Journal of Communications and Networks (JCN), an editor of Elsevier High-Confidence Computing Journal (HCC), and Publication Board Chair of KIISE Journal of Computing Science and Engineering (JSCE).

Lee has received numerous awards, including IEEE Chester W. Sall Memorial Award (2018), KIISE Gaheon Research Award (2011), LG Yonam Foundation Overseas Faculty Member Award (2007), Best Teaching Award (2005, 2009, 2021) from Korea University, and the Best Paper Awards from IEEE ICOIN 2002, ICOIN 2008, and IEEE SocialCom 2016. In 2019, his project "BackPlugged: Wearable-optimized Ultra Low-Power Wi-Fi Networking with Plugged-in Backscatter Radio" was selected for 100 Outstanding National R&D Achievements by the Ministry of Science and ICT (MSIT) in the Republic of Korea. He was a recipient of the Korean Government Overseas Scholarship from the Ministry of Education in the Republic of Korea between 1993 and 1996.

He is the 2022 President-Elect (2023 President) of the Korean Institute of Information Scientists and Engineers (KIISE). He is a Fellow of the IEEE in 2021 for contributions to multiple access and resource allocation in wireless networks, a Fellow of the Korean Academy of Science and Technology (KAST) in 2022, and a member of the National Academy of Engineering of Korea (NAEK) in 2020.

Education 
Lee received his B.S. and M.S. degrees in computer engineering from Seoul National University (SNU), Seoul, Republic of Korea, in 1989 and 1991, respectively, his M.S. degree in computer science from the University of Maryland, College Park, MD, United States, in 1996, and his Ph.D. degree in computer science and engineering from the University of Minnesota, Minneapolis, MN, USA, in 1999.

Awards 

 2022, 2020, 2016, Distinguished TPC Member Award in IEEE INFOCOM
 2021, The 1st Edition of Top Scientists Ranking for Engineering and Technology by Research.com
 2020, IEEE Fellow "for contributions to multiple access and resource allocation in wireless networks"
 2019, The Excellence of National R&D Top 100 by Korean government
 2018, IEEE Chester W. Sall Memorial Award
 2016, The Best Paper Award in the 9th IEEE International Conference on Social Computing and Networking (IEEE SocialCom-2016)
 2015, The Best Paper Runner-up Award in the 2nd International Conference on Big Data and Smart Computing (BigComp-2015)
 2011, KIISE Gaheon Academic Award (가헌학술상)
 2008, The Best Paper Award in 22nd International Conference on Information Networking (ICOIN-2008)
 2007, LG Yonam Foundation Overseas Faculty Member Award
 2003, The Best Paper Award in International Conference on Information Networking (ICOIN-2003)

References 

Fellow Members of the IEEE
Living people
South Korean expatriates in the United States
Year of birth missing (living people)
Seoul National University alumni
University System of Maryland alumni
University of Minnesota alumni